The 2013 NPF Draft is the tenth annual NPF Draft.  It was held April 1, 2013 8:00 PM ET in Nashville, TN at the Ford Theatre at the Country Music Hall of Fame and Museum.  It was broadcast on ESPN3.  The first selection was LSU's Rachele Fico, picked by the Akron Racers.

2013 NPF Draft

Position key: 
C = catcher; INF = infielder; SS = shortstop; OF = outfielder; UT = Utility infielder; P = pitcher; RHP = right-handed pitcher; LHP = left-handed pitcher
Positions will be listed as combined for those who can play multiple positions.

Round 1

Round 2

Round 3

Round 4

Round 5

Draft notes

References

2013 in softball
National Pro Fastpitch drafts
Softball in the United States